Joseph Jordan House, also known as Boykin's Quarter, Jordan's, and Hatty Barlow Moody Farm, is a historic home located near Raynor in Isle of Wight County, Virginia, United States. The original structure was built about 1795, and is a -story, three bay, frame structure with brick ends.  It was later expanded with a two-story, one room, frame addition and a one bay kitchen ell. The house features clerestory monitors that were probably added about 1820–1840.  Also on the property are a variety of contributing outbuildings.

It was listed on the National Register of Historic Places in 1979.

References

Houses on the National Register of Historic Places in Virginia
Houses completed in 1795
Houses in Isle of Wight County, Virginia
National Register of Historic Places in Isle of Wight County, Virginia